Mount Carter may refer to:

Mount Carter (Idaho) in the Sawtooth Range
Mount Carter (Montana) in Glacier National Park